In enzymology, a retinyl-palmitate esterase is an enzyme that catalyzes the chemical reaction

retinyl palmitate + H2O  retinol + palmitate

Thus, the two substrates of this enzyme are retinyl palmitate and H2O, whereas its two products are retinol and palmitate.

This enzyme belongs to the family of hydrolases, specifically those acting on carboxylic ester bonds.  The systematic name of this enzyme class is retinyl-palmitate palmitohydrolase. Other names in common use include retinyl palmitate hydrolase, retinyl palmitate hydrolyase, and retinyl ester hydrolase.  This enzyme participates in retinol metabolism.

References

 

EC 3.1.1
Enzymes of unknown structure